Victor Vechersky (born 15 August 1958) grew up in Kyiv, the Ukrainian SSR of the Soviet Union and present-day Ukraine. He is a Ukrainian architect, who graduated from the Kyiv State Institute of Art architectural department in 1981. He Has a PhD. in architecture since 2001.

Awards, prizes, honorary titles: State Prize of Ukraine in the Field of Architecture in 1998 and 2007; I. Morgilevsky Architectural and Town-planning Prize in 1999; Honored Cultural Worker of Ukraine, 1995.

Current occupation: an architect, a scientist (Deputy Head of the Institute of Monument Protection Research under the Ministry of Culture and Tourism of Ukraine), a teacher (Asst. Prof. National Academy of Visual Arts and Architecture).

Victor Vechersky is the author of numerous architectural studies, including:
Researches and Restoration:
Movchansky Monastery in Putyvl (1981);
Wooden Fortress in Putyvl (1986);
Reconstruction of the House of Ukrainian Painter Mykola Pymonenko in the village of Maliutianka (1990).

Historical architectural plans and the projects of protection areas for historical cities of Ukraine:
Hlukhiv (1984);
Poltava (1984);
Lebedyn (1985);
Chernivtsi (1986, 2006);
Chyhyryn (1987);
Putyvl (1987);
Romny (1987);
Okhtyrka (1988);
Trostianets (1989);
Bilopillia (1990);
Konotop (1991);
Sumy (1993, 2011);
Odessa (2007);
Vasylkiv (2008);
Kyiv (2009–2010).

Projects of creation state historical-architectural preserves in Putyvl (1986), Hlukhiv (1992), Sumy (1993). Rehabilitation and preservation of historical town-building formation in Hlukhiv (1997). State program of preservation of historical town-building formation in Hlukhiv (1999). Master plans of state historical-architectural preserves in Hlukhiv (2003), Putyvl (2006), Chernihiv (2008).

He is also an author of the following documentaries "The World of Ukraine":
"The Temples of Ukraine" (1996),
"The Ukrainian Elite" (1997),
"The Ukrainian Steppe" (1998),
"The Crimea" (1999).

His main books are:
Historical-Architectural Researches of Ukrainian Towns, Moscow, 1990;
The State Register of the National Heritage (Monuments of Architecture and Urbanism), Kyiv, 1999;
Architectural and Urbanistic Heritage of Hetmanate Period: Creation, Research, Preservation, Kyiv, 2001;
The Lost Objects of the Architectural Heritage in Ukraine, Kyiv, 2002;
The Old Urban Heritage: The Historical and Urbanistic Researches for Historic Preservation of Inhabited Sites in Ukraine, Kyiv, 2003;
Hlukhiv, Kyiv, 2003;
Ukrainian Heritage, Kyiv, 2004;
The Lost Temples, Kyiv, 2004;
Heritage of Architecture and Urbanism of Left-bank Ukraine: Recognition, Researches, Recording, Kyiv, 2005;
Castles and Fortresses of Ukraine, Kyiv, 2005;
A History of Architecture, Kyiv, 2006;
A History of Architecture of Eastern Europe, Kyiv, 2007;
Ukrainian Wooden Churches (Kyiv, 2007);
Monasteries and Churches of Putyvl region (Kyiv, 2007),
The Capitals of Ukraine in Hetmanate Period (Kyiv, 2008);
Ukrainian Monasteries (Kyiv, 2008);
The Historical and Urbanistic Researches of Odesa (Kyiv, 2008);
The Historical and Urbanistic Researches of Chernivtsi (Kyiv, 2008);
The Orthodox Churches of Sumy region (Kyiv, 2009);
The Historical and Urbanistic Researches of Kyiv (Kyiv, 2011);
The Historical and Urbanistic Researches: Vasylkiv, Vinnytsia, Gorlivka, Izmail  (Kyiv, 2011);
The historical-cultural preserves (Kyiv, 2011);
The historical-cultural preserves: master plans (Kyiv, 2011);
Fortresses and Castles of Ukraine, (Kyiv, 2011);
Ukrainian Wooden Architecture (Kyiv, 2013);
The Historical and Urbanistic Researches: Sumy, Myrgorod, Korets  (Kyiv, 2013);

References

Castles and fortresses of Ukraine / Victor Vechersky
Castles and fortresses of Ukraine / Victor Vechersky on ArtUkraine.com

1958 births
Living people
Architects from Kyiv
Writers from Kyiv
Laureates of the State Prize of Ukraine in the Field of Architecture